The Crasna is a right tributary of the river Buzău in Romania. It discharges into the Buzău in the village Crasna.

References

Rivers of Romania
Rivers of Covasna County